James Adam Kirk (born 1967) is a United States Navy rear admiral and surface warfare officer who serves as the commander of Expeditionary Strike Group 3 since November 18, 2022. He previously served as a special assistant to the Commander, Naval Surface Force Pacific from June 2022 to November 2022; commander of Carrier Strike Group 15 from June 2021 to June 2022; deputy commander and chief of staff for Joint Warfare Center, Allied Command Transformation in Stavanger, Norway. 

As a captain, Kirk was the first commanding officer of the USS Zumwalt, commissioned in 2014. Due to his name, Kirk is often compared to Star Trek's James T. Kirk.

Naval career
Kirk graduated from the U.S. Naval Academy Class 1990.  He has attended both the U.S. Naval War College and U.S. Army War College graduating with Masters in National Security Studies.

He has served in a variety of afloat and ashore billets as a Surface Warfare officer.  He has served afloat on destroyers, cruisers, frigates and staffs including USS Fife (DD-991), USS The Sullivans (DDG-68), USS Hué City (CG-66), USS John S. McCain (DDG-56), gas turbine inspector on the staff of Commander, United States Pacific Fleet, and operations officer for Carrier Strike Group 7.  He has commanded both USS De Wert (FFG-45), and USS Zumwalt (DDG-1000).

Ashore, Kirk has served as executive assistant to the Navy's Chief of Legislative Affairs, action officer on the Joint Staff J8, executive assistant to the director of Surface Warfare (OPNAV N96), and deputy for Weapons and Sensors to the director of Surface Warfare (OPNAV N96).  As a flag officer, he served as deputy commander and chief of staff for Joint Warfare Center, Allied Command Transformation in Stavanger, Norway; and as commander, Carrier Strike Group Eleven.
Kirk assumed command of Carrier Strike Group Fifteen in June 2021.

In October 2022, Kirk was selected for reassignment as the commander of Expeditionary Strike Group Three.

Awards and decorations

References

1967 births
National War College alumni
Naval War College alumni
People from Arlington County, Virginia
United States Naval Academy alumni
United States Navy admirals
Recipients of the Navy Distinguished Service Medal
Recipients of the Legion of Merit
Living people